Big Beach Boutique II is a mixed compilation album containing some of the songs which were played by British big beat musician Fatboy Slim and Midfield General in a live performance on Brighton Beach on 13 July 2002. There is also a DVD release which features the mix set performed by Fatboy Slim called Big Beach Boutique II – The Movie.

The album reached number 11 in the UK Compilation Chart.

Track listing

Certifications

References 

Fatboy Slim compilation albums
2002 compilation albums